Big Sandy High School or Big Sandy School is a public high school located in Dallardsville, Texas and classified as a 2A school by the UIL.  It is a part of the Big Sandy Independent School District in Polk County, Texas.  In 2015, the school was rated "Met Standard" by the Texas Education Agency.

Athletics
The Big Sandy Wildcats compete in these sports - 

Cross Country, Basketball, Track, Softball & Baseball

State Titles
Boys Basketball - 
1952(B), 1957(B)
Baseball-
2018(2A) 2019(2A)

State Finalists
Boys Basketball - 
1949(B), 1951(B), 1953(B), 1954(B), 1955(B), 1958(B), 1988(1A), 2008(1A), 2015(2A)
Softball - 
2005(1A)

References

External links
 Big Sandy ISD

Public high schools in Texas
Schools in Polk County, Texas